Holway may refer to:

Places
in England
Holway, Dorset
Holway, Somerset  
in the United States
Holway, Wisconsin
Holway Corner, Maine
in Wales
Holway, Flintshire, in Holywell

People
Albert Holway, a Canadian professional ice hockey player
Florence Holway, an American advocate for crime victims
W. R. Holway, an American civil engineer known for his water projects in Oklahoma